Bryan Steel (born 5 January 1969) is an English former professional racing cyclist.

Cycling career
Steel represented Great Britain at the 1992, 1996, 2000 and 2004 Summer Olympics.

He represented England in the individual pursuit and won a bronze medal in the 4,000 metres team pursuit, at the 1990 Commonwealth Games in Auckland, New Zealand. Four years later at the 1994 Commonwealth Games in Victoria, British Columbia, Canada, he won a silver medal in the team pursuit and competed in the individual pursuit. Eight years later he won a third Commonwealth Games medal when winning a silver medal in the team pursuit at the 2002 Commonwealth Games in Manchester.

Personal life
Steel was born in Nottingham and now lives in Sutton near Mansfield and is involved with promoting cycling for D.A.R.E. UK.

Palmarès

1994
1st  Madison, British National Track Championships (with Rob Hayles)
2nd  Team Pursuit, Commonwealth Games

1996
1st  Madison, British National Track Championships (with Simon Lillistone)
3rd  Team Pursuit, 1996 UCI Track Cycling World Cup Classics, Round, Italy
3rd  Team Pursuit, 1996 UCI Track Cycling World Cup Classics, Round, Cottbus

2000
3rd  Team Pursuit, Olympic Games
2nd  Team Pursuit, UCI Track Cycling World Championships

2001
2nd  Team Pursuit, UCI Track Cycling World Championships
3rd British National Circuit Race Championships

2002
2nd  Team Pursuit, Commonwealth Games
3rd  Team Pursuit, UCI Track Cycling World Championships

2003
2nd  Team Pursuit, UCI Track Cycling World Championships
2nd  Pursuit, British National Track Championships
3rd  British National Circuit Race Championships
2nd  Team Pursuit, 2003 UCI Track Cycling World Cup Classics, Round 2, Aguascalientes
2nd  Team Pursuit, 2003 UCI Track Cycling World Cup Classics, Round 3, Cape Town

2004
2nd  Team Pursuit, UCI Track Cycling World Championships
2nd  Team Pursuit, Olympic Games
1st  Team Pursuit, 2004 UCI Track Cycling World Cup Classics, Round 4, Sydney

References

External links

1969 births
Living people
English male cyclists
English track cyclists
Olympic cyclists of Great Britain
Cyclists at the 1992 Summer Olympics
Cyclists at the 1996 Summer Olympics
Cyclists at the 2000 Summer Olympics
Cyclists at the 2004 Summer Olympics
Medalists at the 2000 Summer Olympics
Medalists at the 2004 Summer Olympics
Olympic medalists in cycling
Olympic silver medallists for Great Britain
Olympic bronze medallists for Great Britain
Cyclists at the 1990 Commonwealth Games
Cyclists at the 1994 Commonwealth Games
Cyclists at the 2002 Commonwealth Games
Commonwealth Games medallists in cycling
Commonwealth Games silver medallists for England
Commonwealth Games bronze medallists for England
Sportspeople from Nottingham
Medallists at the 1990 Commonwealth Games
Medallists at the 1994 Commonwealth Games
Medallists at the 2002 Commonwealth Games